Neal Kumar Katyal (born March 12, 1970) is an American lawyer and academic. He is a partner at Hogan Lovells and the Paul and Patricia Saunders Professor of National Security Law at Georgetown University Law Center. During the Obama administration, Katyal served as Acting Solicitor General of the United States from May 2010 until June 2011. Previously, Katyal served as an attorney in the Solicitor General's office, and as Principal Deputy Solicitor General in the U.S. Justice Department. As of 2022, he is a partner of Chamath Palihapitiya Social+capital Partnership and a member of the board of Social Capital Ventures Inc.

Katyal has argued more U.S. Supreme Court cases than any other minority lawyer in American history. He has described himself as an "extremist centrist". While he has been widely praised as one of the United States's leading attorneys, he has been criticized by progressives for arguing against human rights and workers' rights in cases such as Janus v. AFSCME, Epic Systems Corp. v. Lewis, and Nestlé USA, Inc. v. Doe.

Early life and education
Katyal was born in the United States on March 12, 1970, to immigrant parents originally from India. His mother is a pediatrician and his father, who died in 2005, was an engineer. Katyal's sister Sonia is also an attorney and currently teaches law at University of California, Berkeley School of Law. He studied at Loyola Academy, a Jesuit Catholic high school in Wilmette, Illinois. He graduated in 1991 from Dartmouth College, where he was a member of Phi Beta Kappa, Sigma Nu fraternity and the Dartmouth Forensic Union.

Katyal then attended Yale Law School. In law school, Katyal was an editor of the Yale Law Journal, and studied under Akhil Amar and Bruce Ackerman, with whom he published articles in law review and political opinion journals in 1995 and 1996. After receiving his JD in 1995, Katyal clerked for Judge Guido Calabresi of the U.S. Court of Appeals for the Second Circuit, and then Justice Stephen Breyer of the United States Supreme Court.}

Career
President Bill Clinton commissioned him to write a report on the need for more legal pro bono work. In 1999 he drafted special counsel regulations, which guided the Mueller investigation of the Russian government's efforts to interfere in the 2016 presidential election. He also represented Vice-President Al Gore as co-counsel in Bush v. Gore, and represented the deans of most major private law schools in Grutter v. Bollinger.

While serving at the Justice Department, Katyal argued numerous cases before the Supreme Court, including his successful defense (by an 8–1 decision) of the constitutionality of the Voting Rights Act of 1965 in Northwest Austin v. Holder. Katyal also successfully argued in favor of the constitutionality of the Affordable Care Act and won a unanimous decision from the Supreme Court defending former Attorney General John Ashcroft against alleged abuses of civil liberties in the war on terror in Ashcroft v. al-Kidd. Katyal is also the only head of the Solicitor General's office to argue in the Court of Appeals for the Federal Circuit.

As Acting Solicitor General, Katyal succeeded Elena Kagan, whom President Barack Obama chose to replace the retiring Supreme Court Associate Justice John Paul Stevens.

On May 24, 2011, speaking as Acting Solicitor General, Katyal delivered the keynote speech at the Department of Justice's Great Hall marking Asian American and Pacific Islander Heritage Month. Developing comments he had posted officially on May 20, Katyal issued the Justice Department's first public confession of its 1942 ethics lapse in arguing the Hirabayashi and Korematsu cases in the US Supreme Court, which had resulted in upholding the internment of American citizens of Japanese descent. He called those prosecutions—which were only vacated in the 1980s—"blots" on the reputation of his office, which the Supreme Court explicitly considers as deserving of "special credence" when arguing cases, and "an important reminder" of the need for absolute candor in arguing the United States government's position on every case. Katyal also lectured at Fordham Law School concerning that decision.

Katyal was critical of the Guantanamo Bay detention camp.  While teaching at Georgetown University Law Center for two decades, Katyal was lead counsel for the Guantanamo Bay detainees in the Supreme Court case Hamdan v. Rumsfeld (2006), which held that Guantanamo military commissions set up by the George W. Bush administration to try detainees "violate both the UCMJ and the four Geneva Conventions."

Upon leaving the Obama Administration, Katyal returned to Georgetown University Law Center, but also became a partner at the global law firm Hogan Lovells. He specializes in constitutional law, national security, criminal defense and intellectual property, as well as running the appellate practice once run by John Roberts. During law school Katyal clerked one summer at Hogan Lovells, where he worked for Roberts before Roberts's nomination to the US Supreme Court.

Katyal had a cameo appearance in the third season of the American television series House of Cards, acting as defense counsel during a Supreme Court argument.

In 2017, American Lawyer Magazine named Katyal its Grand Prize Litigator of the Year for 2016 and 2017.

Katyal has been criticized for filing briefs taking anti-union positions in two Supreme Court cases, Janus v. AFSCME. and Epic Systems Corp. v. Lewis. Katyal's employer, Hogan Lovells, characterized Katyal's successes in these cases as a "major win for employers."

In 2020, Katyal represented Nestle and Cargill at the Supreme Court in Nestlé USA, Inc. v. Doe, in a class-action suit brought by former enslaved children who were kidnapped and forced to work on cocoa farms in the Ivory Coast. Katyal's argument that Nestle and Cargill should not be held liable for their use of child slave labor because the corporation that supplied Zyklon B to the Nazis to kill Jews and other minorities in extermination camps was not indicted at the Nuremberg trials received considerable criticism from liberal publications like The New Republic. 

In 2021, Katyal represented financial giant Citigroup in their efforts to recoup a mistaken transfer of $900 million to creditors of Revlon Inc. Katyal also worked with the prosecution team in State v. Chauvin.

In 2022, Katyal argued for the respondents in Moore v. Harper before the Supreme Court, a case involving election law, redistricting, and the independent state legislature theory.

Also in 2022, Katyal represented Johnson & Johnson in a civil suit where the company was being sued for selling talcum baby powder with carcinogens. His billing rate for this was $2465 per hour.

Political positions
Katyal endorsed President Donald Trump's nomination of Neil Gorsuch to the Supreme Court in an op-ed to The New York Times. When that newspaper's public editor criticized the op-ed for failing to disclose Katyal had active cases being considered by the Court, Katyal responded that it would have been obvious he always has cases being heard by the Supreme Court. Katyal formally introduced Judge Gorsuch on the first day of his Senate Judiciary Committee confirmation hearings.

In addition to Gorsuch, Katyal also spoke highly of President Trump's nomination of Brett Kavanaugh to the Supreme Court. In multiple tweets that were cited by Republican Senate Majority Leader Mitch McConnell in favor of Kavanaugh's confirmation, Katyal praised Kavanaugh's "credentials [and] hardworking nature", and described his "mentoring and guidance" of female law clerks as "a model for all of us in the legal profession". Katyal has also described Kavanaugh as "very gracious", and "incredibly likable". During a July 2018 panel on Kavanaugh's nomination sponsored by The Heritage Foundation, a conservative think-tank, he commented: "It's very hard for anyone who has worked with him, appeared before him, to frankly say a bad word about him." Katyal's comments in support of Kavanaugh were made before Christine Blasey Ford's Senate Judiciary Committee testimony.

Honors and awards
The US Justice Department awarded Katyal the Edmund Randolph Award, the highest honor the Department can bestow on a civilian. The National Law Journal named Katyal its runner-up for "Lawyer of the Year" in 2006 and in 2004 awarded him its Pro Bono award. American Lawyer Magazine considered him one of the top 50 litigators nationally. Washingtonian Magazine named him one of the 30 best living Supreme Court advocates; Legal Times (jointly owed by American Lawyer Media) profiled him as one of the "90 Greatest Lawyers over the Last 30 Years".

Personal life
Katyal is married to Joanna Rosen, a physician. His brother-in-law is Jeffrey Rosen, president and CEO of the National Constitution Center in Philadelphia. His sister Sonia Katyal is the Chancellor's Professor of Law and co-director of the Berkeley Center for Law & Technology at UC Berkeley.

Works

See also
 Barack Obama Supreme Court candidates
 List of law clerks of the Supreme Court of the United States (Seat 2)

References

Further reading
 Nina Totenberg, "Hamdan v. Rumsfeld: Path to a Landmark Ruling", NPR, September 5, 2006
 Georgetown University Law Center faculty profile , containing a link to his publications, awards and cases argued
 Website maintained by Hamdan's defense team, including counsel profiles and briefs 
 Profile about Katyal and Hamdan case , Vanity Fair, March 2007	
 "Katyal's Crusade: How an Overachieving Law Professor Toppled the President's Terror Tribunals", Legal Times July 31, 2006
 "A Patriot's Act", Dartmouth Alumni Magazine, July 2006

External links

Profile at Georgetown University Law Center

|-

|-

1970 births
American democracy activists
American lawyers
American legal scholars
American legal writers
Clinton administration personnel
Dartmouth College alumni
Georgetown University Law Center faculty
Guantanamo Bay attorneys
Law clerks of the Supreme Court of the United States
Living people
Obama administration personnel
United States Solicitors General
Yale Law School alumni
People associated with Hogan Lovells
American academics of Indian descent